The 2011 Mid-Eastern Athletic Conference men's basketball tournament took place on March 7–12, 2011 at the Lawrence Joel Veterans Memorial Coliseum in Winston-Salem, North Carolina. The championship game was nationally televised on ESPN2 on Saturday, March 12, 2011, at 2:00 p.m. The tournament champion Hampton received an  automatic berth into the 2011 NCAA tournament.

Bracket

Asterisk denotes game ended in overtime.

References

MEAC men's basketball tournament